Roberto Rodríguez Ruelas (Mexico City, 1909-1995) was a Mexican film director. Brothers Roberto and Joselito Rodríguez were working in Hollywood as sound engineers in 1931 when Mexican President Pascual Ortiz Rubio, on an official visit to the city of Los Angeles, came to hear of their work and personally invited them to return to Mexico to film a sound-movie using the brothers' sound system - the result was the film Santa, 1932.

Selected filmography
 Santa, 1932 with actor-director Antonio Moreno, starring Lupita Tovar and Donald Reed
 The Two Orphans (1950)
 Diario de una madre 1956
 El gato con botas 1961
 La Bandida 1963

References

Mexican film directors
1909 births
1995 deaths